Sir Alan Hugh Cook FRS (2 December 1922 – 23 July 2004) was an English physicist who specialised in geophysics, astrophysics and particularly precision measurement.

Early life and family
Cook was born in Felsted, Essex in 1922. He was the eldest of the six children of Reginald Thomas Cook, a customs and excise officer, and his wife, Ethel,  Saxon, who was active in the Congregational church. His family were active churchgoers and Cook retained a lifelong Christian commitment. He was educated first at the village school at Felsted, then at West Leigh School and finally (from 1933) at Westcliff High School for Boys. In 1939 he won a major entrance scholarship to Corpus Christi College, Cambridge.

On 30 January 1948 he married Isabell Weir Adamson. The couple had a son and a daughter. He died from cancer on 23 July 2004 at Arthur Rank House, Cambridge.

Academic and scientific career
Cook entered Corpus Christi College in 1940, reading 'the natural science tripos' (physical sciences, biological sciences and the history and philosophy of science) and geology, receiving a BA in 1943. On graduation, he was drafted into the Admiralty Signals Establishment (now part of the Admiralty Research Establishment) as a temporary experimental officer, in the field of electronic counter-measures.

After the war he returned to Cambridge, where he studied for his doctorate under Edward Bullard and B. C. Browne. His dissertation was on precise measurements of gravity in the British Isles. This developed into his core research interest: precision measurement in a wide range of areas the physical sciences. Thereafter, he did post-doctoral work there in geodesy and geophysics.

Cook followed Bullard to the National Physical Laboratory at Teddington, working at the meteorological department, where he carried out a number of experiments, including the absolute measurement of the density of mercury, important for precise estimates of atmospheric pressure; measuring the absolute acceleration of falling bodies, and determining the Earth's gravitational potential, by using the precisely known orbits of the Sputnik satellites. His interests included precision measurement for time and length standards, particularly using hyperfine lines in the spectrum of cadmium and interference spectroscopy, laser interferometry and masers. 
In 1966 he became superintendent of the Laboratory's quantum metrology division.

In 1969 he became professor of geophysics at Edinburgh University, founding that university's geophysics department. Three years later, he was appointed Jacksonian Professor of Natural Philosophy at the Cavendish Laboratory, University of Cambridge, where he set up the laboratory astrophysics group. His work there included experiments in microwave spectroscopy and tests of the inverse square law of gravitation at short distances. In 1979 he became head of the Laboratory, and from 1983 to 1993 was master of Selwyn College. His PhD students included the future astronaut Michael Foale. After retiring he took a strong interest in the history of science, and was the editor, from 1996, of Notes and Records of the Royal Society of London, that Society's main journal on the history of science.

Honours and awards
1969: Fellow of the Royal Society.
1988: President of the Royal Astronomical Society.
1988: Knighthood
1993: The Chree Medal and Prize

Publications
 Gravity and the earth (1969)
 Celestial Masers (1977)
 Gravitational experiments in the laboratory (1993)
 The observational foundations of physics (1994)
 Edmond Halley: charting the heavens and the seas (1998)

References

1922 births
2004 deaths
Fellows of the Royal Society
British physicists
Masters of Selwyn College, Cambridge
Alumni of Corpus Christi College, Cambridge
Fellows of King's College, Cambridge
Jacksonian Professors of Natural Philosophy
Knights Bachelor
Presidents of the Royal Astronomical Society
People from Felsted
Scientists of the Cavendish Laboratory
Deaths from cancer in England